Pennine Journey is a  circular trail that starts and ends in Settle, North Yorkshire, England. The route is based on a walk taken by Alfred Wainwright in 1938 and described by him in a book published in 1986.

Route 
The route begins (and ends) in Settle, North Yorkshire, heading north along the eastern edge of the Pennines, over Penyghent where the trail meets the Pennine Way. The path continues past Askrigg to Tan Hill (where it enters the North Pennines AONB), Bowes and Tees High Force to Hexham. After Hexham it turns westwards along  of Hadrian's Wall, before heading south at Greenhead to Alston, Appleby, Kirkby Stephen, and Garsdale. It then turns westwards through Grisedale and across the northern edge of Baugh Fell to Sedbergh, before heading south over Whernside and Ingleborough (with a dog-leg to Ingleton), and returning to Settle.

Several Ordnance Survey maps are needed to complete the route (OL2: Yorkshire Dales southern and western areas, OL19: Howgill Fells & Upper Eden Valley, OL30: Yorkshire Dales northern and central areas, OL31: North Pennines, OL41: Forest of Bowland & Ribblesdal, OL43: Hadrian's Wall, and 307: Consett & Derwent Reservoir).

One of those who developed the route in 2004 stated that it had two advantages over the Pennine Way: it is a circular route, and takes in all three of the Yorkshire peaks, as opposed to just one on the Pennine Way.

History 
The route was first traversed by Alfred Wainwrght in 1938, though the modern version differs somewhat from the route Wanwright took, with most of the modern-day walk being off-road. Wanwright had travelled from Blackburn to Settle to undertake the walk in 1938 as a way of coping with the looming Second World War. 

 He meticulously detailed his route, which encourages the modern-day hiker to take the walk in an anticlockwise direction.

In 1998, two walkers developed the route, and persuaded the Wainwright Society to adopt it in 2004. In 2016, it was marked on Ordnance Survey maps for the first time. In 2020, the Wainwright Society launched a campaign to have the path recognised as a National Trail, which would mean that it would be promoted by Natural England. There are hopes that the trail could be designated by September 2028, the 90th anniversary of when Wainwright himself started the walk.

Waymarking 
The waymarker for the trail is either a blue or yellow arrow with a circle inset within it. Inside the circle are the letters A and W with the A on top and the W below both in blue. The A and W are Alfred Wainwright's initials.

References

Sources

Further reading

External links 
Webpage with sketch map of the route

Long-distance footpaths in the United Kingdom
Footpaths in Northumberland
Footpaths in North Yorkshire
Footpaths in Cumbria
Pennines